Tuscarora Creek is a  tributary of the Potomac River in Frederick County, Maryland, in the United States.

See also
Tuscarora Creek (Monocacy River)
List of rivers of Maryland

References

Rivers of Frederick County, Maryland
Rivers of Maryland
Tributaries of the Potomac River